David Martin Donald (born 9 November 1987 in Aberdeen, Scotland) is a Scottish professional football defender, who has been without a club since leaving Peterhead in 2012.

Donald started his career with Aberdeen and became the youngest player in their history when he made his debut on 15 May 2004 against Dundee at Pittodrie. He only made one other appearance for Aberdeen and he was released at the end of the 2006-07 season.

Donald was quickly signed by Peterhead after his release by the Dons.
David went on to play for Woodside amateurs where he became a legend winning multiple titles

Notes

External links

Living people
1987 births
Footballers from Aberdeen
Association football defenders
Scottish footballers
Aberdeen F.C. players
Peterhead F.C. players
Scottish Football League players
Scottish Premier League players